Kampung Perian is a village within the settlement of Pulau Tawar, in Jerantut District, Pahang, Malaysia.

Jerantut District
Villages in Pahang